Bhai Gurdas (1551 – 25 August 1636) was a Sikh writer, historian and preacher who served as the Jathedar of the Akal Takht from 1606 to his death in 1636. He was the original scribe of the early version of Guru Granth Sahib.

Early life
Bhai Gurdas was possibly born in 1551 (exact year unknown but likely between 1543-1553) at Basarke Gillan, a small village in the Punjab. He was the only child of Bhai Ishar Das, nephew of Guru Amar Das, and Mata Jivani. Bhai Gurdas was near 3 years of age when his mother died.

After being orphaned at the age of 12, he was adopted by Guru Amar Das. Bhai Gurdas learned Sanskrit, Braj Bhasha, Persian and Punjabi and eventually began preaching. He spent his early years at Goindval and Sultanpur Lodhi. At Goindval, Gurdas listened and obtained knowledge from scholars and swamis that continuously visited the town while traversing the Delhi-Lahore road. He later moved to Varanasi, where he studied Sanskrit and Hindu scriptures. After Guru Amar Das left for his heavenly abode, his successor Guru Ram Das, assigned Bhai Gurdas as a Sikh missionary to Agra.

Later life
In 1577, Bhai Gurdas contributed his labour to excavating the Sarovar at Darbar Sahib. Twenty years later, he went on an expedition to Kartarpur and recited many of the early hymns to Emperor Akbar. Akbar was impressed by their spiritual content and was satisfied they had no anti-Muslim tone.

After Guru Ram Das left the world, Bhai Gurdas formed a close relationship with the fifth Guru, Guru Arjan. The Guru had great respect for him, and regarded him as his maternal uncle ("mama"). Gurdas led a group of Sikhs to Gwalior, where the Mughal emperor Jahangir, jealous of the popularity of Sikhism, had imprisoned Guru Hargobind. After that, Gurdas was sent to Kabul, Kashmir, Rajasthan, and Varanasi again to preach Sikhism. He even went to Sri Lanka, preaching the name of the Guru among the masses and showing them the true way of life.

Literary works
Bhai Gurdas completed the Adi Granth in 1604. It took him nearly 19 years to scribe. He not only wrote the Adi Granth, as dictated by Guru Arjan, but also supervised four other scribes (Bhai Haria, Bhai Sant Das, Bhai Sukha and Bhai Manasa Ram) in the writing of various Sikh scriptures. His other works in Punjabi are collectively called Vaaran Bhai Gurdas. Aside from his well-known Vaars, he also wrote Kabits, a form of poetry, in the Braj-language.

Writings
6 Chhands of 8 Verses each in Sanskrit
672 Kabits and 3 Swayyas in Brij Bhasha
40 Vaars containing 912 Pauris in Punjabi

Jathedar of Akal Takhat (1606-1636) 

The Akal Takht was revealed by Guru Hargobind on 15 June 1606. The foundation stone of the building of the Akal Takht was laid down by Guru Hargobind himself. The rest of the structure was completed by Baba Buddha and Bhai Gurdas. No mason or any other person was permitted to participate in the construction of the structure. Guru Hargobind himself was the custodian of the Takht. On 31 December 1612, when Guru Hargobind was imprisoned at Gwalior Fort, he assigned Baba Buddha to perform the services at Harmandir Sahib and Bhai Gurdas as the first Jathedar of Akal Takht.

Death
He left his body for eternal abode on 25 August 1636 at Goindwal. Guru Hargobind personally performed the ceremonial service at his funeral.

See also
 Sikh Gurus

References

External links
  Sikh Marg

1551 births
1636 deaths
Punjabi-language poets
Sikh missionaries
Punjabi people
Family members of the Sikh gurus
Indian Sikhs
Indian writers